Nagla Bairu is a small village of Tehsil Patiyali in Kanshiram Nagar district of Uttar Pradesh in the northern part of India. It is situated near the Daryavganj Railway Station in the north eastern railway zone. There are all castes living in this village except Yadav. This village is totally dependent on agriculture. The village has been roundly covered with different trees. In the evening many birds from different parts of the country can be seen. Agriculture is the main source of the economy. There are some crops cultivated like lahsan, tobacco, peppermint, makka, wheat, sweet potato. 
This village is famous for a big zamindar thakur suresh Singh son of Thakur kunvar singh (Charat singh),Thakur sugar singh  (Bharat singh). He was a very kindly and respected person in many districts nearby Distt. kasganj.. He was very royal towards his policy. He was known for his generosity and honesty.

Mahmood Nagla is the other name of this village.

References

Villages in Kasganj district